Ferdinand August Otto Heinrich, Graf von Loeben (18 August 1786 in Dresden – 3 April 1825 in Dresden) was a German writer.

Biography
He was born into an aristocratic Protestant family, and was educated by private tutors. From 1804 he studied law at the University of Wittenberg, but moved to Heidelberg in 1807, where he befriended Joseph von Eichendorff, also meeting Achim von Arnim, Clemens Brentano and Johann Joseph von Görres. Over the next few years he travelled between Vienna, Dresden and Berlin, meeting Friedrich de la Motte Fouqué at Nennhausen. He was involved in the campaign of 1813-14; after his return, he married Johanna Victoria Gottliebe née von Bressler and spent the rest of his life in Dresden. A stroke suffered in 1822 left him an invalid until his death.

Graf von Loeben was a very prolific writer of the Dresden school, and he influenced Eichendorff and Ludwig Tieck among others, but quickly fell out of favour, most later critics viewing his work as bordering on parody. His most important novel is Guido, written under the pen-name "Isidorus Orientalis". Under a second pseudonym, Heinrich Goeble (sometimes just H. Goeble), he authored the poem Abendlied unterm gestirten Himmel, set to music by Ludwig van Beethoven as WoO 150. See Theodore Albrecht, "Otto Heinrich Graf von Loeben (1786-1825) and the Poetic Source of Beethoven's Abendlied unterm gestirnten Himmel, WoO 150," in Bonner Beethoven-Studien, Band 10 (Bonn: Verlag Beethoven-Haus, 2012), pp. 7–32.

An article about him can be found in the Allgemeine deutsche Biographie, and a monograph by Raimund Pissin was published in Berlin in 1905. On the basis of these two sources, Porterfield enumerates his known works as "one conventional drama, one musical-romantic drama, two narrative poems, one of which is on Ferdusi, three collections of poems, between 30 and 40 novelettes, fairy tales and [several thousand] aphorisms and detached thoughts." He is discussed by his friend Eichendorff in Ahnung und Gegenwart (ch. 12) and Erlebtes (ch. 10).

Selected works
Guido, novel
Das weisse Ross, eine altdeutsche Familienchronik in 36 Bildern, a novelette (1817)
Die Sonnenkinder, short story
Die Perle und die Maiblume, novelette
Cephalus und Procris, play
Ferdusi
Persiens Ritter, short story
Die Zaubernächte am Bosporus
Prinz Floridio, fairy-tale
Leda, short story
Weinmärchen, fairy-tales
Gesänge
Abendlied unterm gestirten Himmel

See also

Porterfield, Allen Wilson. "Graf von Loeben and the Legend of Lorelei." Modern Philology, Vol. 13, No. 6 (Oct., 1915), pp. 305–332.  A highly critical account of some of Loeben's works, dismissing the theory that one of his poems of 1821 provided the inspiration for Heinrich Heine's Die Lorelei.
Ignaz Hub, ed. Deutschlands Balladen- und Romanzen-Dichter. Karlsruhe, 1845. Contains five poems, some with alterations.

1786 births
1825 deaths
German poets
19th-century German novelists
Writers from Dresden
People from the Electorate of Saxony
German male poets
German male novelists
19th-century German male writers
19th-century German writers